George Michael Biondo (born September 3, 1945) is a musician who served as bass guitarist of the Canadian rock band Steppenwolf from April 1970 to October 1976. Born in New York, Biondo has been based in Southern California throughout a career as a session musician and songwriter.

Early career
Biondo played bass in a Los Angeles area band called Storybook People during which time they released a single on Dunhill Records, which received limited airplay in Los Angeles.  In 1968, Biondo replaced Nick St. Nicholas in another Los Angeles area band called T.I.M.E., when St. Nicholas departed for Steppenwolf.  After T.I.M.E. guitarist Larry Byrom also left to join Steppenwolf, T.I.M.E. briefly attempted to carry on with Biondo as lead singer, but never released any further recordings.

Steppenwolf
In early 1970, Biondo replaced St. Nicholas a second time when he joined Steppenwolf for the recording of Steppenwolf 7, contributing lead vocals on "Fat Jack" and co-lead vocals on "Foggy Mental Breakdown" and the chart-hit, "Who Needs Ya'".  In 1971, the band released their last new album for Dunhill, For Ladies Only for which Biondo wrote "Sparkle Eyes" with John Kay and "In Hopes of a Garden".  He sang lead on the latter, as well as "Jaded Strumpet".  When Steppenwolf went on hiatus in 1972, Biondo became a founding member of the John Kay Band, appearing on both of Kay's solo albums on Dunhill Records.  When Steppenwolf reconvened in the mid-1970s, Biondo was brought back for the album Slow Flux. Then writing "Two for the Love of One" for the Hour of the Wolf album.  Biondo later wrote "Sleep" and co-wrote the instrumental "Lip Service" with Bobby Cochran and Wayne Cook for the Skullduggery album in 1976.  In 1981, Biondo added backing vocals to Wolftracks, the first studio album by John Kay and his new band, now under the moniker John Kay & Steppenwolf.

After Steppenwolf
In 1980, Biondo reunited with Steppenwolf cofounder Jerry Edmonton in a band called Steel Rose. A Steel Rose single penned by Biondo, "Good That You're Gone", was released on Dore Records, and featured Biondo on lead vocals.  When Steel Rose disbanded in 1984, Biondo returned to writing and freelance club and session work.

Discography

Studio albums
71970U.S. #19GoldDunhill Records
For Ladies Only1971U.S. #54Dunhill Records
Forgotten Songs and Unsung Heroes1972Dunhill Records
My Sportin Life ("Sing with the Children" only)1973Dunhill Records
Slow Flux1974U.S. #47Mums Records
Hour of the Wolf1975U.S. #155Epic Records
Skullduggery1976Epic Records
Wolftracks1982 Attic Records
Good That You're Gone1984Dore Records

Compilations
Gold: Their Great Hits1971U.S. #24GoldDunhill Records
Rest In Peace1972U.S. #62Dunhill Records
16 Greatest Hits1973U.S. #152GoldDunhill Records
The ABC Collection1976ABC Records
Reborn To Be Wild1976Epic Records
Born to Be Wild - A Retrospective1991MCA Records
All Time Greatest Hits1999MCA Records
20th Century Masters - The Millennium Collection: The Best of Steppenwolf2000GoldUniversal Music Group
Steppenwolf Gold2005Geffen Records

Singles

References

American bass guitarists
American rock singers
American male singer-songwriters
Singer-songwriters from New York (state)
American rock songwriters
1945 births
Living people
Musicians from Brooklyn
Steppenwolf (band) members
Guitarists from New York (state)
American male guitarists
20th-century American guitarists
American male bass guitarists